Arlington High School is a public high school in Arlington, Nebraska, United States, operated by Arlington Public Schools.

References

1957 establishments in Nebraska
Educational institutions established in 1957
Public high schools in Nebraska
Schools in Washington County, Nebraska